Lucien Eugène Prévost (29 June 1863 – 26 November 1961) was a French cyclist who won the first edition of Paris–Tours in 1896. He also rode in the 1904 Tour de France, but dropped out on the first stage.

References

External links 

French male cyclists
1863 births
1961 deaths